Ezra Feivel Vogel (July 11, 1930 — December 20, 2020) was an American sociologist who wrote prolifically on modern Japan, China, and Korea, and worked both in academia and the public sphere. He was Henry Ford II Professor of the Social Sciences at Harvard University. 

His 1978 book Japan as Number One: Lessons for America was a best-seller in both English and Japanese, and his 2011 book Deng Xiaoping and the Transformation of China won the Lionel Gelber Prize.

Biography
Ezra Vogel was born to Joseph and Edith Vogel, a family of Jewish immigrants in 1930 in Delaware, Ohio. As a child, he helped his father in the family's clothing store, which was called The People's Store. He graduated from Ohio Wesleyan University in 1950, and maintained close ties with his alma mater for the rest of his life, donating royalties from his books and returning to campus frequently. While at Ohio Wesleyan, Vogel was a member of the Beta Sigma Tau fraternity (later merged with the Pi Lambda Phi fraternity). 

He was drafted to serve two years in the U.S. Army without seeing combat during the Korean War. The service involved working for a psychiatric unit of a military hospital. After discharge, Vogel enrolled in the Department of Social Relations at Harvard and graduated with his PhD in 1958.  His advisor was Talcott Parsons. After two years of field work in Japan, he worked as an assistant professor at Yale University from 1960–1961, but returned to Harvard for post-doctoral work on Chinese language and history. He was appointed as a Lecturer in 1964, later becoming a tenured professor; he remained at Harvard until his retirement.

Vogel was involved with several research groups during his career.   He was director of Harvard's East Asian Research Center from 1972–1977 and Chairman of the Council for East Asian Studies from 1977–1980. He also was director of the Program on US–Japan Relations at the Center for International Affairs from 1980–1987, and was named Honorary Director upon stepping down. He was Director of the Fairbank Center for Chinese Studies from 1973–1975 and 1995–1999.  He was the founding director of the Asia Center (1997–1999). He retired on June 30, 2000.

Vogel was married to Charlotte Ikels, professor of anthropology at Case Western University. He had three children with his first wife, Suzanne Hall Vogel: David, Steven (who became a political scientist), and Eve.

Vogel died in Mount Auburn Hospital in Cambridge, Massachusetts, on December 20, 2020. He was 90 years old.

Career
Vogel published dozens of articles, reviews, conference papers and books on China, Japan, and American–East Asian relations, and organized scholarly and policy conferences. He headed the undergraduate East Asian Studies concentration (major) at Harvard.

After editing a book of readings on the sociology of the family, Vogel published his first book, Japan’s New Middle Class (1963; 2nd ed.1971), using ethnographic research he and his wife Suzanne carried out through interviews and observation in a Tokyo suburb between 1950–1960. Their goal was to understand the life of the "salary man" and his family, a new group that had emerged after the war. Vogel then turned from ethnography to China watching. He studied Chinese language, read newspapers and documents, and conducted interviews in Hong Kong. Canton Under Communism (1969) was a detailed description of regional government and politics in Guangdong. His 1979 book, Japan as Number One, described those areas where Japan had been successful and the United States less so. “Most Japanese understate their successes because they are innately modest," he wrote, and "more purposive Japanese, wanting to rally domestic forces or to reduce foreign pressures, have chosen to dramatize Japan’s potential disasters”. On the American side, he continued, "our confidence in the superiority of Western civilization and our desire to see ourselves as number one make it difficult to acknowledge that we have practical things to learn”. The book's translation into Japanese was a best-seller, arousing debate among American scholars of Japan.

Vogel's later areas of research included industrialization, changes in family structure, political change, and security issues in South Korea, Hong Kong, Taiwan and East Asia overall. In Beijing, he began to study Deng Xiaoping, following extensive interviews with Deng's economic adviser Yu Guangyuan. Vogel co-translated Yu's memoir on China's economic reform, and used it as a roadmap to his thinking on Deng. He continued publishing after his retirement: his last two books were Deng Xiaoping and the Transformation of China (2011) and China and Japan: Facing History (2019). He contributed his royalties from the Chinese translation of this Deng political biography to his alma mater, Ohio Wesleyan, to promote international study and travel. The University estimated the contribution to be over $500,000.

Vogel served as National Intelligence Officer for East Asia with the National Intelligence Council from 1993 to 1995. In 1999, when American forces bombed the Chinese Embassy in Belgrade, Vogel was reported by The Guardian as saying that it was not credible that the embassy was bombed by mistake when the C.I.A. used old maps. He later added "I find it hard to believe that anyone would consciously do such a thing and certainly not as a matter of policy. On the other hand I don't find it hard to believe that a massive mistake happened with a series of pitfalls and miscues adding up to disaster."

Starting in 2000, Vogel organized a series of conferences between Chinese, Japanese, and Western scholars to work together to examine World War II in East Asia; his intent was to promote reconciliation among the countries and support politicians who wanted to solve the lingering problems from that era. One of the resulting conference volumes was China at War: Regions of China, 1937–1945 (2007), co-edited with Stephen R. Mackinnon and Diana Lary.

Publications
In a statistical overview derived from writings by and about Ezra Vogel, OCLC/WorldCat returns 150+ works in 400+ publications in 12 languages and 14,900+ library holdings.

Selected books and edited volumes
 A Modern Introduction to the Family (1960), with Norman W. Bell 
 . 2nd ed. 1971. On Internet Archive.
 Canton under Communism; Programs and Politics in a Provincial Capital, 1949–1968 (1969) 
 Modern Japanese Organization and Decision-making (1975) 
 Japan as Number One: Lessons for America (1979) 
 Comeback, Case by Case : Building the Resurgence of American Business (1985) 
 Ideology and National Competitiveness: an Analysis of Nine Countries (1987) 
 One Step Ahead in China: Guangdong under Reform. (1989) 
 Chinese Society on the Eve of Tiananmen: The Impact of Reform. (1990), with Deborah Davis 
 The Four Little Dragons: The Spread of Industrialization in East Asia (1993 )  The 1990 Edwin O. Reischauer Lectures
 Living with China : U.S./China Relations in the Twenty-First Century. (1997) 
 Is Japan Still Number One?  (2000) 
 The Golden Age of the U.S.-China-Japan Triangle, 1972–1989 (2002), with Ming Yuan and Akihiko Tanaka 
  China at War : Regions of China, 1937–1945 (2007), with Stephen R. Mackinnon, Diana Lary 
 Deng Xiaoping and the Transformation of China (2011)  
 The Park Chung Hee Era : The Transformation of South Korea (2011) 
 China and Japan: Facing History (2019)

Edited Translations
Yu Guangyuan; Levine, Steven I. & Ezra, Vogel F. with an introduction by Ezra Vogel. Deng Xiaoping Shakes the World: An Eyewitness Account of China's Party Work Conference and the Third Plenum. Norwalk: EastBridge, 2004.

Selected articles

Notes

References

External links

 
 "Ezra F. Vogel,"  Harvard University Asia Center. Biographies, photos, extensive biographical material, bibliography, and other resources.
 Remembering Ezra Vogel  Graham Allison, Thomas Gold, Melinda Liu, Michael Szonyi. National Committee on U.S. China Relations (February 10, 2021)

1930 births
2020 deaths
American Japanologists
American sinologists
Harvard Graduate School of Arts and Sciences alumni
Harvard University faculty
Historians from Ohio
Ohio Wesleyan University alumni
People from Delaware, Ohio
Military personnel from Ohio